Mukdahan is a city in Thailand. It may also refer to:

 Mukdahan Province
 Amphoe Mueang Mukdahan, the local authority districts of the city